Stempfferia suzannae is a butterfly in the family Lycaenidae.

References

Butterflies described in 1981
Poritiinae
Endemic fauna of the Democratic Republic of the Congo
Butterflies of Africa